Ernest Victor Wright (24 January 1909 – 4 March 1964) was an English-born footballer who played as an inside forward in the 1920s and 1930s, notably with Rotherham United and Liverpool. He was the son of William Wright and Patience Wootton of Bloxwich, and a first cousin to Aston Villa player Charlie Athersmith.

Career
Wright began his career with hometown club Bloxwich Strollers. In 1929, Wright signed for Bristol City. After a short spell at Bristol City, Wright signed for Rotherham United. In 1930, Wright joined Sheffield Wednesday, where he made two league appearances. A year later, Wright re-signed for Rotherham United, playing for the club for three years. On 14 March 1934, Wright signed for Liverpool. He made his debut against Birmingham on 17 March 1934. His last appearance came on 10 April 1937, and in all he scored 33 times in his 85 games for the club. Following his spell at Liverpool, Wright joined Plymouth Argyle for a transfer fee of £1,000. In 1938, Wright signed for Chelmsford City, playing in Chelmsford's debut season. In World War II, Wright guested for Millwall, Crystal Palace and Walsall.

References

1909 births
1964 deaths
People from Bloxwich
Bloxwich Strollers F.C. players
Bristol City F.C. players
Rotherham United F.C. players
Sheffield Wednesday F.C. players
Liverpool F.C. players
Plymouth Argyle F.C. players
Chelmsford City F.C. players
Millwall F.C. wartime guest players
Crystal Palace F.C. wartime guest players
Walsall F.C. wartime guest players
Association football inside forwards
English Football League players
English footballers